Just Me is the 2001 fifth studio album by British singer/actor Davy Jones and was released through Fire Inside Records. It was recorded within eleven years of its release in various studios across Central PA and is a critic favorite among all of his albums.

Background and history

In the early 1990s, Jones started working on "Just Me". He had been writing all of these songs by himself, and some would later be released on the Monkees reunion album Justus ("It's Not Too Late" and "What A Night"). The tracks were recorded in various studios around Central PA, where Jones' summer home was located.

Singles

Hold Me Tight 
When You Tell Me That You Love Me
It's Not Too Late

Track listing

 "Hold Me Tight"
 "When You Tell Me That You Love Me" 
 "I Wanna Be Me"
 "My Love (She Means Everything)"
 "Hurry Up Slow Down" 
 "It's Not Too Late"
 "I'm Still in Love with You"
 "If Only for One Moment"
 "What a Night"
 "So Goes Love"
 "I Ain't Gonna Love You No More"
 "I'm Still in Love with You (Reprise)/Intro/Hold Me Tight"

Accompanying musicians

Members of the Jones/Monkees road band performed the "Just Me" sessions along with players from the Williamsport Symphony Orchestra, John Bechdel, Tim Breon, Rusty Richards, John Mase, Central Pennsylvania bands and other notables.

References 

2001 albums
Davy Jones (musician) albums